, also known by his Chinese style name , was a royal of Ryukyu Kingdom.

Kin Chōtei was the second head of a royal family called Kin Udun. He was the fourth son of Shō Kyū (Prince Kin Chōkō), and also a younger brother of King Shō Hō. He served as sessei from 1629 to 1654.

Prince Kin was dispatched to Satsuma for several times. He was dispatched as gratitude envoy for King Shō Hō's taking power to Edo, Japan in 1634. He went to Edo together with Prince Sashiki Chōeki (also known by Shō Bun ), who was congratulatory envoy to celebrate Tokugawa Iemitsu succeeded as shōgun of the Tokugawa shogunate. They sailed back at the end of this year.

Prince Kin brought tea seeds from Satsuma to Ryukyu, and planted them in Kanna village of Kin magiri (modern Kin, Ginoza, Okinawa). From then on, Ryukyu began to plant tea plants.

References

1600 births
1663 deaths
Princes of Ryūkyū
Sessei
People of the Ryukyu Kingdom
Ryukyuan people
17th-century Ryukyuan people